Pulya+ Disk 2 (means 'Bullet+ (Disc 2)') is a re-released album of the Russian ska-punk band Leningrad.

Track listing
"Быстряк" - Bystryak (Fast Play) – 0:52   	 
"Лёля" - Lyolya – 2:39
"Военная" - Voyennaya (Military Song) – 2:23
"Звёзды и Луна" - Zvyozdy i Luna (Stars and Moon) – 2:26
"Света" (Sveta) – 1:53 
"Дорога на Москву" - Doroga na Moskvu (Road to Moscow) – 2:44  	 
"Zenit" - Zenit (FC Zenit St. Petersburg) – 2:23  	
"Витебский вокзал" - Vitebskiy vokzal (Vitebsky Rail Terminal) – 3:05  	
"Разбитое сердце" - Razbitoye serdtse (Broken Heart) – 2:49  	 
"Инструментал" (Instrumental) – 3:10  	
"Вечеринка" - Vecherinka (Party get-together) – 3:23  
"Дикий мужчина" - Dikiy muzhchina (Wild Man) – 2:26  	
"Шоу-бизнес" - Shou-biznes (Show Business) – 3:12  	
"Баян" - Bayan – 1:20  	
"Дачники" - Dachniki (Farmers) – 2:08

2001 albums
Leningrad (band) albums